Ryan Grigson (born February 23, 1972) is an American football executive who is the senior vice president of player personnel for the Minnesota Vikings of the National Football League (NFL). From 2012 to 2016, he served as the general manager of the Indianapolis Colts.

Grigson played college football as a tight end and offensive tackle for the Purdue Boilermakers and was drafted by the Cincinnati Bengals in the sixth round of the 1995 NFL Draft. He was a member of the Detroit Lions from 1995 to 1996, and played for the Toronto Argonauts of the Canadian Football League in 1997 before he retired due to a back injury. Grigson was a pro scout for the Saskatchewan Roughriders and an assistant coach for McPherson College in 1998. In 1999, he was a player personnel coordinator and assistant coach for the Buffalo Destroyers of the Arena Football League.

From 1999 to 2003, Grigson was a national and regional scout for the St. Louis Rams. He was hired by the Eagles as a western regional scout in 2004, and was promoted to director of college scouting in 2006. He was promoted to director of player personnel in 2010. He also has worked with the Seattle Seahawks and Cleveland Browns.

Playing career

College
Grigson signed his letter of intent to play college football for the Purdue Boilermakers in 1990, where he would play from 1990 to 1994. On October 10, 1992, in a game against Minnesota, Grigson was hit in the abdomen by a defender and sustained a life-threatening injury. He was hospitalized immediately after and the blow resulted in pancreatitis, kidney failure and pneumonia.  He missed the rest of the season, likely to never play again, after becoming a starter during his sophomore year. 
Grigson returned for the 1993 season, started ten games and was named one of three captains, along with Mike Alstott and Matt Kingsbury, for the 1994 season (Purdue's first winning season in a decade).

Professional
Grigson was drafted by the Cincinnati Bengals in the sixth round (175th overall) of the 1995 NFL Draft. He was signed to a contract by the Bengals on June 10, 1995, but was waived during final cuts on August 28. He was signed by the Detroit Lions shortly thereafter and spent the 1995 season with the team. He was released by the Lions on August 14, 1996. He played for the Toronto Argonauts of the Canadian Football League in 1997 before he suffered a career-ending back injury and was forced to retire.

Executive and coaching career

Early career
Following his retirement from playing, Grigson became a pro scout for the Saskatchewan Roughriders in 1998. In the same year, he was an assistant coach for McPherson College's football team. In 1999, he was a player personnel coordinator and assistant coach for the Buffalo Destroyers of the Arena Football League.

National Football League
Grigson was hired by the St. Louis Rams as a national scout in 1999. He was part of the Rams' Super Bowl XXXIV championship team in 1999 and the Rams' NFC Championship/Super Bowl XXXVI team in 2001 as an area scout.

On May 15, 2004, Grigson was hired by the Philadelphia Eagles as a western regional scout. He was a part of the Eagles' NFC Championship/Super Bowl XXXIX team in 2004. On June 8, 2006, he was promoted to director of college scouting, and on February 3, 2010, he was promoted to director of player personnel.

Indianapolis Colts
Grigson was hired by the Indianapolis Colts as their general manager on January 11, 2012, inheriting a 2-14 team from the year before.  After the 2012 season, which put the Colts back in the NFL Playoffs with an 11–5 record, the nine win improvement from the previous year tied the third largest improvement in league history.  Thanks to this turnaround, which included changing 70% of the roster, Grigson earned Executive of the Year honors from the Sporting News  and Pro Football Weekly. He also won the 2013 Drew Brees Mental Toughness Award from the Northwest Indiana Chapter of the National Football Foundation.
On September 18, 2013, Ryan Grigson traded a 2014 first-round draft pick for Trent Richardson. The Colts were looking for a running back after a season-ending injury to Vick Ballard. Richardson was released following the 2014 NFL season.

On January 11, 2015—Grigson's third anniversary with the team—the Indianapolis Colts beat the Denver Broncos to qualify for the AFC Championship game against the New England Patriots. During the AFC championship, he asked NFL officials to check the Patriots' balls, which set in motion the "Deflategate" scandal.  The Colts lost the game 45–7.

The Colts, who struggled with injuries including one to quarterback Andrew Luck, stumbled in the 2015 season and finished 8-8 and out of the playoffs. They did, however, manage to set the NFL record for the longest winning streak against any division in the league with their 16th consecutive victory over an AFC South opponent when they beat the Houston Texans during Week 5. The record surpassed the previous mark of 15, recorded by the Super Bowl Champion Miami Dolphins against the AFC East during the perfect season of 1972 and into the following season.  On January 4, 2016, the Colts announced that Grigson and head coach Chuck Pagano had both received contract extensions through the 2019 season.

On January 21, 2017, Grigson was relieved of his duties as general manager. The Colts failed to make the playoffs in the two consecutive seasons leading up to his firing, the first time the team had missed the playoffs in consecutive years since the 1997–98 seasons. One move that made many question Grigson was the infamous Trent Richardson deal that lost the Colts a first round draft pick. While at the time the move was applauded by many football pundits and fans, the trade ultimately didn't work out.  Trent Richardson ended up averaging only 3.1 yards per carry and scoring only 6 touchdowns in 2 seasons with the team and was a healthy scratch during the AFC Championship game in 2015. Another questionable move that confused many was the drafting of Phillip Dorsett in the 1st round of the 2015 NFL draft, while the Colts offensive line was struggling to protect their franchise quarterback, and their defense coming off a less than mediocre season.  However a trade that worked out exceptionally well for Grigson and the Colts was the acquisition of former first round draft pick Vontae Davis in 2012 who was a big part of the 2012 turnaround and was later named to the Pro Bowl in both 2014 and 2015.  Another move by Grigson was the trade and subsequent selection of T.Y. Hilton in the 2012 NFL draft.  Grigson essentially gave up a fifth round pick for the right to move up from the early fourth to the late third round and select a three time Pro Bowl Selection and the NFL's leading receiver in 2016.  Overall, the Colts had a regular season record of 49-31 (.613 winning percentage) while Grigson was general manager.

Cleveland Browns (first stint)
On May 24, 2017, Grigson was hired as the senior personnel executive for the Cleveland Browns. In January 2018, the Browns announced that he was no longer part of the team's front office personnel.

Seattle Seahawks
On June 13, 2018, Grigson was hired as a senior football consultant for the Seattle Seahawks, and stayed with the team through the 2019 NFL season.

Cleveland Browns (second stint)
Grigson was hired by the Cleveland Browns in an advisory and consulting role in February 2020. The deal was made official on May 29, 2020.

Minnesota Vikings
On June 12, 2022, the Minnesota Vikings named Grigson as their senior vice president of player personnel.

Personal life
Ryan Richard Grigson was born to Jeff and Juanita (Rokita) Grigson in 1972. Jeff (d.1980) played football at Northwest Missouri State University.

Grigson attended Our Lady of Grace Catholic School from 1978 to 1986. He played high school football at Highland Senior High from 1986 to 1990. As a sophomore, he was a member of the Trojan team that played in the 1987 5A State Championship game at the Colts' original stadium, the Hoosier Dome (RCA Dome).

Grigson met his wife, Cynthia, while the two were students at Purdue University. The couple married in 2001 and have six children.

References

External links
 Indianapolis Colts bio

1972 births
Living people
American football offensive tackles
American football tight ends
Cincinnati Bengals players
Detroit Lions players
Indianapolis Colts executives
Philadelphia Eagles executives
Minnesota Vikings executives
Purdue Boilermakers football players
St. Louis Rams scouts
Toronto Argonauts players
People from Highland, Lake County, Indiana
Players of American football from Indiana
National Football League general managers
Saskatchewan Roughriders personnel
McPherson Bulldogs football coaches
Arena Football League executives